Diardi is a sports car manufacturer in Turkey by the Çenberci Group.

Motor 

Diardi has passed German TÜV tests and regulations.

Its galvanized steel chassis is welded in special manner and certified for up to  engines. The variety of engine sizes is optional and available as per customer's choice and specific needs.

As standard production line, a  Fiat Sporting Engine is used.

Information
Çenberci Group represents the third generation of the Turkish Automotive Sector. Çenberci is currently a major Suzuki reseller in the Aegean Region of Turkey.

After research conducted in 2000, Çenberci CEO Ömer Çenberci decided to create a new sports car, the Diardi, in 2001.

External links 
 Çenberci Group Official Web Site
 Suzuki Official Web Site

Vehicle manufacturing companies established in 1987
Sports car manufacturers
Cars of Turkey
Turkish brands